The men's 4 × 100 metre freestyle relay event at the 2018 Commonwealth Games as part of the swimming program took place on 6 April at the Gold Coast Aquatic Centre.

Records
Prior to this competition, the existing world and Commonwealth Games records were as follows.

The following records were established during the competition:

Results

Heats
The heats were held at 11:54.

Final
The final was held at 22:07.

References

Men's 4 x 100 metre freestyle relay
Commonwealth Games